Celestial Mechanics and Dynamical Astronomy is a scientific journal covering the fields of astronomy and astrophysics. It was established as Celestial Mechanics in June 1969. The journal is published by Springer Science+Business Media and the editor-in-chief is Alessandra Celletti (University of Rome Tor Vergata), while Sylvio Ferraz-Mello (University of São Paulo) is honorary editor.

Abstracting and indexing 
The journal is abstracted and indexed in:

According to the Journal Citation Reports, the journal has a 2020 impact factor of 1.664.

References

External links 
 

Astronomy journals
Publications established in 1969
Springer Science+Business Media academic journals
Monthly journals
English-language journals